Victory Park is a neighborhood in Pasadena, California. It is bordered by New York Drive to the north, Orange Grove Boulevard to the south, Altadena Drive to the west, and Sierra Madre Boulevard to the east.

Landmarks
At the center of the neighborhood is the park from which the neighborhood gets its name, which was originally a military airfield. The area also was home to Earthlink headquarters.

Education
Victory Park is home to Pasadena High School (commonly referred to as PHS) and is also served by Field Elementary School, Norma Coombs Elementary School, and Norma Coombs Alternative School. Marine Corps Reserve Training Center, Blecksmith Hall, borders victory park to the South, East. Assumption Middle School is a private school in the area.

Transportation
Victory Park is served by Metro Local line 256. It is also served by Pasadena Transit routes 31, 32, and 40.

Neighborhoods in Pasadena, California